Frank Young may refer to:
Frank L. Young (1860–1930), New York assemblyman and Supreme Court justice
Frank Albert Young (1876–1941), United States Marine and Medal of Honor recipient
Frank A. Young (sportswriter) (1884–1957), pioneering African American sportswriter
Frank Young (baseball) (1885–?), American baseball player
Frank Young (rugby, born c. 1885) (c. 1885–?), Welsh rugby union and rugby league player
Frank Young (Australian rugby league) (fl. 1930s), Australian rugby league player
Frank Edward Young (VC) (1895–1918), British Army officer and recipient of the Victoria Cross
Sir Frank Young (biochemist) (1908–1988), British biochemist and first Master of Darwin College, Cambridge
Frank Young (rower) (1929–2018), Canadian Olympic rower
Frank E. Young (physician) (1931–2019), American physician, administrator of the Food and Drug Administration
Frank Young (basketball) (born 1984), American college basketball player for the West Virginia Mountaineers

See also
Francis Young (disambiguation)